Auriculella crassula is a species of air-breathing tropical land snails, terrestrial pulmonate gastropod mollusks in the family Achatinellidae. This species is endemic to Hawaii.

References

Auriculella
Molluscs of Hawaii
Taxonomy articles created by Polbot